Martin R. Zirnbauer  (born 25 April 1958) is a professor of theoretical physics at the University of Cologne.

Zirnbauer studied at the Technical University of Munich and Oxford University, where he earned his PhD. In 1987 he was appointed at age 29 to  Cologne. In 1996 he acquired his professorial chair. Among his foreign research sabbaticals, he visited the California Institute of Technology in Pasadena. His research specialty is the mathematical physics of mesoscopic systems.

Awards 
In 2009 for his research he received the prestigious Leibniz prize from the Deutsche Forschungsgemeinschaft, which granted him over a period of seven years 2.5 million €. In 2012 he was awarded the Max Planck medal.

External links 
 Zirnbauer website at U. of Cologne

1958 births
20th-century German physicists
Theoretical physicists
Technical University of Munich alumni
Living people
Winners of the Max Planck Medal
21st-century German physicists
Academic staff of the University of Cologne